The 2017 LINAFOOT was supposed to be the 2nd season of the LINAFOOT, the top Chadian league for association football clubs since its establishment in 2015. Gazelle as 2015 season winners, were the defending champions, since 2016 season was interrupted due financial difficulties. The season started on 7 May 2017.

Events

Following financial difficulties and the lack of sponsors, FTFA decided to implement the new format of the national championship, which would lower the costs. In 2017 FIFA proposed to FTFA a new championship format, which FTFA accepted. The new formula of the national football championship takes place in two phases. The first phase is called a zonal phase, and consists of three zones. Zone 1 consists of six clubs from N'Djamena (RFC, Gazelle, Tourbillon, Elect-Sport, Foullah Ediffice and Ascot), Zone 2 consists of the clubs from Sarh, Koumra, Doba, Moundou, Pala and Bongor, Zone 3 includes the clubs of Moussoro, Ati, Biltine, Mongo, Salamat and Abéché. At the end of the zonal confrontations, three clubs in Zone 2 and Zone 3 will join the 4 qualifiers in Zone 1 to start the second phase of the championship. The 5th and 6th of the final ranking will be officially relegated to lower division. Matches were usually being played at 4 p.m. local time. Zone 1 playoff matches were being played on 3 stadiums: Stade d'Académie de Farcha, Stade Omnisports Idriss Mahamat Ouya and Stade de Paris-Congo.

League playoff

Zone 1 playoff

Zone 2 playoff

The following 6 teams compete in Zone 2 playoff for the national championship:

ASCOT Moundou (Moundou) - champions of Moundou
AS Lycod Doba (Doba) - champions of Doba
FC Kebbi (Bongor) - champions of Bongor
Abeilles FC Mandoul - champions of Koumra
Champions of Sarh
Sonacim FC (Pala) - champions of Pala

Zone 3 playoff

The following 6 teams compete in Zone 3 playoff for the national championship:

AS Mirim Mongo (Mongo) - champions of Mongo
AS Wadi Fira (Biltine) - champions of Biltine
Eléphant de Zakouma (Am Timan) - champions of Salamat
Ouaddaï FC (Abéché) - champions of Abéché
Champions of Moussoro
Champions of Ati

Second phase

The teams that qualified for the Second Phase of championship are:

AS CotonTchad (N'Djamena) - from Zone 1
Foullah Edifice FC (N'Djamena) - from Zone 1
Gazelle FC (N'Djamena) - from Zone 1*
Renaissance FC (N'Djamena) - from Zone 1
Elect-Sport FC (N'Djamena) - from Zone 1*
Tourbillon FC (N'Djamena) - from Zone 1*
ASCOT Moundou (Moundou) - from Zone 2
AS Lycod Doba (Doba) - from Zone 2
Abeilles FC Mandoul - from Zone 2
AS Mirim Mongo (Mongo) - from Zone 3
AS Wadi Fira (Biltine) - from Zone 3
Eléphant de Zakouma (Am Timan) - from Zone 3
Note: Gazelle FC excluded; Elect-Sport FC and Tourbillon FC admitted

The second phase began in October 2017, but was suspended in November 2017.

Managers

References

External links 
Chad 2017, RSSSF.com

Chad
Chad
Foo
Football leagues in Chad